Villevaudé is a commune in the Seine-et-Marne department in the Île-de-France region in north-central France.

Demographics
Inhabitants of Villevaudé are called Villevaudéens.

People
 Ivan Peychès (1906–1978) Member of the French Academy of Sciences, Officer of the Légion d'honneur.
 Léonor Fini, surrealist painter

See also
Communes of the Seine-et-Marne department

References

External links

Official site of the Mairie de Villevaude 
1999 Land Use, from IAURIF (Institute for Urban Planning and Development of the Paris-Île-de-France région) 

Communes of Seine-et-Marne